Martijn Jacob van Nellestijn (born 6 March 1978) is a Dutch film director.

Selected filmography 
2019: De Brief voor Sinterklaas

References

Living people
1978 births
Dutch film directors